The Menace of the Mute is a 1915 American silent film based on a short story by John T. McIntyre. It is the second film in the “Ashton-Kirk, Investigator” series, preceded by An Affair of Three Nations, and followed by The House of Fear. As with the first film in this series, it was directed by Ashley Miller and Arnold Daly, with Daly producing as well. The film is presumed lost.

Plot
A young woman (Louise Rutter), who believes her fiancé (William Harrigan) may have committed a murder, asks Ashton Kirk to investigate the crime. The fiancé admits he went to the man's (Sheldon Lewis) home to retrieve plans for a submarine that was invented by his father, who is a scientist, and stolen by the murdered man, but the fiancé claims he left the home before retrieving the plans. Kirk uses a train conductor's punch ticket to discover the identity of the murderers, one of whom is a mute, and sets a trap to apprehend the suspects.

Cast

Arnold Daly - Ashton Kirk
Sheldon Lewis - David Hume
Louise Rutter - Edyth Vail
William Harrigan - Allen Morris
Charles Laite - Pendleton
Martin Sabine
George Melville

Background
After completion of the film, Daly said in the November 1915 issue of The Moving Picture World that the picture made him think of the advertising slogan used in connection with a certain product - "more than a little better". He also stated that his film "is a distinct advance on my first, An Affair of Three Nations, and if I can continue to improve that way with each picture I shall be well pleased". Daly's next film in the Ashton-Kirk series, The House of Fear was released in 1915 as well.

Reviews
Margaret I. MacDonald gave a positive review in The Moving Picture World at the time, saying that Daly knew how to "manufacture and stage a thrilling melodramatic situation". She also praised the production saying "its situations are tense, its photography good, and it has all the attributes of a good box office attraction".

See also
Film preservation
Lost film

References

External links

1915 films
American silent feature films
American black-and-white films
Lost American films
American mystery films
Films based on short fiction
Film serials
1915 mystery films
1915 lost films
Lost mystery films
1910s American films
Silent mystery films